Staniszewo  (Cashubian Stajszewò) is a village in the administrative district of Gmina Kartuzy, within Kartuzy County, Pomeranian Voivodeship, in northern Poland. There is a school in Staniszewo. Students learn three languages - English, German and Kashubian.

For details of the history of the region, see History of Pomerania.

The village has a population of 915.

References

Staniszewo